Manuel Sarkis Hassassian (born 28 December 1953, Jerusalem) is a Palestinian- Armenian professor, who from late 2005 to October 2018 was the Palestinian Authority's diplomatic representative to the United Kingdom, after being appointed to the position by Palestinian Authority President Mahmoud Abbas.

Hassassian left his homeland for brief periods after his high school years to pursue his higher education, earning his BA in Political Science from the American University of Beirut in 1975, his MA in International Relations from Toledo University, Ohio, US, in 1976 and his PhD in Comparative Politics from the University of Cincinnati, Ohio, in 1986.

Hassassian worked at Bethlehem University for twenty five years as a professor of political science and in administrative roles at the University: Dean of Students, Dean of the Faculty of Arts and Chair of the Humanities Department and for the past nine years as the Executive Vice President, during which time he also served as the President of the Rectors' Conference of the Palestinian Ministry of Higher Education and President of the Palestinian-European-American Cooperation in Education (PEACE) program.

Hassassian has been a representative of the University at the Ministry of Higher Education, at the Association of Arab Universities, and among other international academic organizations. He has also been a visiting scholar at the University of Reims, France; Villanova University, US; University of Maryland at College Park, US; University of Vermont, USA; Earlham College, US; and the University College, Dublin, Ireland.

In addition to senior administrative responsibilities at Bethlehem University, during his tenure at Bethlehem University, Hassassian made scholarly contributions in the field of political science with the publication of over 100 reviews, articles and chapters, including Palestinian Political Culture, Civic Society and the Concept of Citizenship, The Transformation of Palestinian Civil Society and its Role in Developing Democratic Trends in the West Bank and Gaza Strip, and Historical Justice and Compensation for Palestinian Refugees. Hassassian also served as a consultant to the Higher Ministerial Committee for Church Affairs, the Ministry of Planning and International Cooperation, UNESCO, the Palestinian Negotiating Team on Refugee Final Settlement, the Orient House P.L.O. Office in Jerusalem as Chief Political Advisor to the late Faysal Husseini, Minister of State Affairs – Head of the Jerusalem File, and the Ministerial Commission on Refugees, among others.

Among his academic awards and honors, Hassassian was awarded an honorary doctorate by the University of Reims, France, and nominated by the Center of International Development and Conflict Management, University of Maryland, for the Gleitzman Middle East Award. In March 2015, he was awarded the Grassroot Diplomat Initiative Award under the social driver category for his extensive work on promoting the rights of the Palestinian people as the country's representative in the UK.

In a speech in the UK Parliament in 2013, Hassassian said: “I’m reaching the conclusion that the Jews are the children of God, the only children of God and the Promised Land is being paid by God! I have started to believe this because nobody is stopping Israel building its messianic dream of Eretz Israel to the point I believe that maybe God is on their side.” A pro-Israel activist then challenged Hassassian over what he had said.  The Labour Party leader, Jeremy Corbyn, in a subsequent speech, defended Hassassian in the face of what Corbyn called “deliberate misrepresentations by people for whom English was a first language, when it isn’t for the ambassador.” Corbyn said:
	 
“We had a meeting in Parliament in which Manuel [Hassassian] made an incredibly powerful and passionate and effective speech about the history of Palestine ... This was dutifully recorded by the thankfully silent Zionists who were in the audience on that occasion; and then came up and berated him afterwards for what he had said. They clearly had two problems. One is they don't want to study history and, secondly, having lived in this country for a very long time, probably all their lives, they don't understand English irony either. Manuel does understand English irony and uses it very very effectively.”
	 
Some commentators claimed that this statement was anti-Semitic.

See also
Palestine - United Kingdom relations

References

External links
The Two-State Solution: The Way Forward, Fathom: For a deeper understanding of Israel and the region, 12 June 2014

1953 births
Living people
People from Jerusalem
Palestinian diplomats
Palestinian people of Armenian descent
Ambassadors of the State of Palestine to the United Kingdom
American University of Beirut alumni
University of Toledo alumni
University of Cincinnati alumni
Academic staff of Bethlehem University
Ambassadors of the State of Palestine to Hungary
Ambassadors of the State of Palestine to Denmark